Charles-Étienne Gaucher (1740 – 1804) was a French engraver, born and died in Paris, was first a pupil of Basan, and afterwards of J. P. Le Bas.

Portraits
He engraved several portraits and other subjects, of which the following are the principal:He engraved several portraits and other subjects, of which the following are the principal:

Maria Cecilia, Ottoman Princess, daughter of Achmet III; after his own design.
M. du Paty, celebrated Advocate; after Notte.
Louis Gillet.
Louis Augustus, Dauphin of France; after Gautier.
J. P. Timoléon de Cossé, Duke of Brissac; after St. Aubin.
Louis de Grimaldi, Bishop of Le Mans. 1767.

Various subjects
An allegorical subject, to the memory of J. P. Le Bas; after Cochin.
The Crowning of Voltaire; after Moreau.
The Card-players; after Tilborch.
Repose; after Gaspar Netscher.

References

 

1740 births
1804 deaths
French engravers
Artists from Paris